The 2012–13 Serie A (known as the Serie A TIM for sponsorship reasons) was the 111th season of top-tier Italian football, the 81st in a round-robin tournament, and the 3rd since its organization under a league committee separate from Serie B. It began on 25 August 2012 and ended on 19 May 2013. Juventus were the defending champions.

A total of 20 teams contested the league, comprising 17 sides from the 2011–12 season and three promoted from the 2011–12 Serie B. As in the previous years, Nike provided the official ball for all matches, with a new Nike Maxim Serie A model to be used throughout the season for all matches.

On 21 August 2012, FIGC allowed Serie A teams to have up to 12 substitution players on the bench for each game.

Events

The 2012–13 season features the return of Pescara, Torino, and Sampdoria, who were promoted back to Serie A after nineteen, three, and one years respectively. It is also Cagliari's first season out of Stadio Sant'Elia after more than 40 years, following its closure due to safety issues; as a replacement, the team agreed to renovate the Stadio Is Arenas located in Quartu Sant'Elena, in order to use it as its home venue for this season (Cagliari has ongoing plans to build its own brand-new stadium in the next few years). The fixtures were presented on 26 July in a lavish hour-long televised ceremony.

Teams

Stadia and locations

Personnel and sponsorship

(*) Promoted from Serie B

Managerial changes

League table

Results

Season statistics

Top goalscorers

Scoring
 First goal of the season: Maicosuel for Udinese against Fiorentina (25 August 2012)
 Fastest goal of the season: 18 seconds
 Arturo Vidal for Juventus against Internazionale (3 November 2012)
 Latest goal of the season: 90+5 minutes
 Panagiotis Kone for Bologna against Catania (30 September 2012)
 Josip Iličić for Palermo against Catania (21 April 2013)
 Largest winning margin: 6 goals
 Sampdoria 6–0 Pescara (27 January 2013)
 Lazio 6–0 Bologna (5 May 2013)
 Highest scoring game: 8 goals
 Torino 3–5 Napoli (30 March 2013)
 Most goals scored by a single team: 6 goals
 Pescara 1–6 Juventus (10 November 2012)
 Sampdoria 6–0 Pescara (27 January 2013)
 Lazio 6–0 Bologna (5 May 2013)
 Most goals scored by a losing team: 3 goals
 Cagliari 4–3 Torino (24 February 2013)
 Torino 3–5 Napoli (30 March 2013)
 Internazionale 3–4 Atalanta (7 April 2013)
 Fiorentina 4–3 Torino (21 April 2013)

Clean sheets
 Most clean sheets: 19
 Juventus
 Fewest clean sheets: 5
 Pescara

Discipline
 Most yellow cards (club): 111
 Atalanta
 Most yellow cards (player): 16
 Daniele Conti (Cagliari)
 Most red cards (club): 13
 Atalanta
 Most red cards (player): 2
 Davide Astori (Cagliari)
 Kevin-Prince Boateng (Milan)
 Carlos Carmona (Atalanta)
 Andrea Costa (Sampdoria)
 Danilo (Udinese)
 Felipe (Siena)
 Daniele Gastaldello (Sampdoria)
 Kamil Glik (Torino)
 Thomas Heurtaux (Udinese)
 Federico Peluso (Atalanta)
 Luca Rossettini (Cagliari)
 Vladimír Weiss (Pescara)
 Fewest yellow cards (club): 77
 Juventus

References

1
Serie A seasons
Italy